The Kras Stadion is a multi-purpose stadium in Volendam, Netherlands.  It is currently used mostly for football matches and is the home stadium of FC Volendam. The stadium is able to hold 6,984 people and was built in 1975.

References

1975 establishments in the Netherlands
Football venues in the Netherlands
Multi-purpose stadiums in the Netherlands
Sports venues in North Holland
Volendam
FC Volendam
20th-century architecture in the Netherlands